Clément Beaud (born 7 December 1980) is a Cameroonian former professional footballer who played as a midfielder.

Career
Beaud began playing football with Tonnerre Yaoundé in Cameroon. He went to Europe, where he would play in Poland and Lithuania before moving to Portugal for much of his career. After a brief spell in the Portuguese Liga with Associação Académica de Coimbra, he has spent most of his time in the second and third levels of Portuguese football, including stints with Moreirense F.C. and S.C. Esmoriz. Now play in Grupo Desportivo Vitória de sernache.

Beaud played for the gold medal-winning Cameroon squad at the 2000 Summer Olympics in Sydney.

External links
 
 
 

1980 births
Living people
Cameroonian footballers
Association football midfielders
Tonnerre Yaoundé players
Widzew Łódź players
FK Vėtra players
Associação Académica de Coimbra – O.A.F. players
Moreirense F.C. players
Académico de Viseu F.C. players
CD Operário players
C.D. Cinfães players
S.C. Lamego players
G.D. Vitória de Sernache players
Olympic medalists in football
Medalists at the 2000 Summer Olympics
Olympic gold medalists for Cameroon
Footballers at the 2000 Summer Olympics
Expatriate footballers in Poland
Cameroonian expatriate sportspeople in Poland
Expatriate footballers in Portugal
Cameroonian expatriate sportspeople in Portugal